Badopal is a village in Pilibanga tehsil of Hanumangarh District in the Indian state of Rajasthan.

Demographics
Badopal is located at 29°21'30"N  74°4'49"E.

Importance
Badopal is famous for the saltwater lake. A variety of birds species are found in the Badopal Lake. Around eighty one species of birds have been recorded here as of 2002.
Flamingo is most well known migratory bird that come in the winter season.
Terracota of the early Gupta period are excavated in the ancient Theris found in the village and the ancient terracotta of Badopal, Rrajasthan is known from that time.

Transport
Badopal lies on Suratgarh-Rawatsar road. It can be reached from Hanumangarh, Pilibangan, Suratgarh and Rawatsar. There are buses available to Badopal village.

Railways
Suratgarh is the nearest major railway station to Badopal village.

See also
Kalibangan
Pilibanga
Hanumangarh
Suratgarh
Bikaner

References

Cities and towns in Hanumangarh district